Alexander II (died April 1, 1510) was a king of Georgia in 1478 and of Imereti from 1483 to 1510.

Life
In 1478, his father Bagrat VI died and Alexander became king of Georgia, initially ruling its two major regions, Imereti in the west and Kartli in the east. Alexander was expelled from the kingdom by a rival prince Constantine II. Alexander retired to the mountainous western provinces of Racha and Lechkhumi. Alexander recovered Imereti after Constantine’s defeat at the hands of Qvarqvare II Jaqeli, a powerful atabeg of Samtskhe, in 1483, but lost the capital Kutaisi to Constantine again a year later. In 1488, Alexander took advantage of the Ak Koyunlu Turkoman invasion of Kartli, and seized control of Imereti. In 1491, Constantine had to recognise his rival as independent sovereign, and to confine himself to the government of Kartli.

Peace between the two Georgian kingdoms did not last long, and in August 1509, Alexander invaded Kartli, taking its western regions as well as the fort-city of Gori. News that Imereti had been raided by the Ottomans during Alexander's absence made the king to return to Kutaisi, and Gori was soon taken back by David X of Kartli.

Family
In 1483, Alexander II married a woman named Tamar who died on March 12, 1510. Alexander died on April 1, 1510 and was buried with his wife at the Gelati Monastery near Kutaisi. They were survived by four children:

 Bagrat III (1495–1565), who succeeded Alexander as king of Imereti.
 Prince David (fl. 1510 – 1524).
 Prince Vakhtang (fl. 1512 – 1548), sometime in opposition to his brother Bagrat III.
 Prince Giorgi (fl. 1511 – 1545), who was married to a woman named Ana.  
 Prince Demetre (fl. 1511). 
 Princess Tinatin, who was married Spiridon Beenashvili (Cholokashvili). 
 Anonymous princess, who was married twice, secondly to Giorgi, son of Rostom Gurieli.

References

Sources

External links

Kings of Imereti
Eastern Orthodox monarchs
Bagrationi dynasty of the Kingdom of Imereti
1510 deaths
Year of birth unknown